The Mindanao sphenomorphus (Pinoyscincus mindanensis)  is a species of skink, a lizard in the family Scincidae. The species is endemic to the Philippines.

Geographic range
P. mindanensis is found in the southern Philippines, on the islands of Bohol, Leyte, and Mindanao.

Habitat

Description

Reproduction
The mode of reproduction of P. mindanensis is unknown.

References

Further reading
Brown WC, Alcala AC (1980). Philippine Lizards of the Family Scincidae. Dumaguete, Philippines: Silliman University Natural Science Monograph Series. x + 246 pp. (Sphenomorphus mindanensis, p. 174).
Linkem CW, Diesmos AC, Brown RM (2011). "Molecular systematics of the Philippine forest skinks (Squamata: Scincidae: Sphenomorphus): testing morphological hypotheses of interspecific relationships". Zoological Journal of the Linnean Society 163 (4): 1217–1243. (Pinoyscincus mindanensis, new combination).
Taylor EH (1915). "New species of Philippine lizards". Philippine Journal of Science, Section D, General Biology, Ethnology, and Anthropology 10 (2): 89–109 + Plate I. (Sphenomorphus mindanensis, new species, pp. 99–100 + Plate I, figures1–2).

Pinoyscincus
Reptiles described in 1915
Taxa named by Edward Harrison Taylor